Mayo Hibi was the defending champion, having won the event in 2013, but chose to participate at Gatineau instead.

Top seed Olivia Rogowska won the title, defeating seventh seed Julia Boserup in the final, 6–2, 7–5.

Seeds

Main draw

Finals

Top half

Bottom half

References 
 Main draw

Fsp Gold River Women's Challenger – Singles
FSP Gold River Women's Challenger